Altaf Fatima (10 June 1927 – 29 November 2018) was a Pakistani Urdu novelist, short story writer, and teacher (specializing in Muhammad Iqbal). Altaf Fatima was born in Lucknow, she moved to Lahore during the Partition, earning MA and BEd from the University of Punjab. Her novel Dastak Na Do ("Do not Knock") is regarded as one of the defining works in the Urdu language. An adaptation was presented on Pakistan television and an abridged translation was serialised by the Karachi monthly, Herald. In 2018, Fatima received the KLF Urdu Literature award at the 9th Karachi Literature Festival for her book, Deed Wadeed. She died on 29 November 2018.

Works

Novels
 Nishaan-i-Mehfil (1975)
 Dastak Naa Do (1964) (The One Who Did Not Ask (Novel) English translation published by Heinemann in 1994) 
 Chalta Musafir (1981)
 Khwabgar (2008)

Collection of short stories
 Woh Jissay chaha gaya(1969)
 Jab Deewarein Girya Karti Hain (1988)
 Taar-i-Ankaboot (1990)
 Deed Wadeed (2017)
 Gawahi Akhir e Shab Ki (2018)

Translations
 Naghmay ka Qatal (Urdu Translation of Harper Lee's novel To Kill a Mockingbird)
 Mere Bachay Meri Daulat (Urdu Translation of My Children, My Gold by Debbie Taylor)
 Barrey Aadmi, Aur Unke Nazariyat. A collection of political essays
 Moti. Urdu Translation of The Pearl by John Steinbeck
 Sach Kahaniyan (2000) (Urdu translation of Truth Tales i.e. Gujrati, Marathi, Tamil and Hindi Short Stories)
 Zaitoon ke Jhund (2016) (Urdu translation of Santa Claus in Baghdad by Elsa Marston)
 Japani Afsana Nigar Khawateen (1994) (Urdu translation of collection of Japanese short stories )
 Haveli ke Ander. (Urdu translation of Inside the Haveli by Rama Mehta)
  Urdu translation of collection of South American short stories

Tanqeed
 Urdu Adab Mein Fann e Sawaneh Nigari ka Irtiqa (1961)

General
 Rozmarra Aadaab (1963)

References

See also

List of Pakistani writers

1927 births
2018 deaths
Muhajir people
Pakistani women novelists
Pakistani novelists
20th-century Pakistani women writers
20th-century Pakistani writers
Urdu-language novelists
Women writers from Uttar Pradesh
Writers from Lahore
Writers from Lucknow